Backyard wrestling (BYW), also referred to as yarding or backyarding, is an underground hobby and sport involving untrained practices of professional-style wrestling, typically in a low-budget environment, such as a backyard. Although not legitimized, backyard wrestling is often organized into federations. Most backyard wrestlers are merely emulating modern wrestling, though a small percentage have experience from enrolling in wrestling school or from referring to how-to guides on the internet.

History
Pro wrestling personnel are generally opposed to backyard wrestling. Its peak years of popularity were  1996-2001, during the boom period of professional wrestling, notoriously known as The Attitude Era, when high-risk stunts exerted a strong influence on the wrestling fan base, particularly those performed by Mick Foley. In the late 1980s and early 1990s, backyard wrestling often appealed to media as a good-natured topic, but it increasingly turned reckless and ultra-violent, worrying parents and wrestling companies. In response, WWE began airing advertisements stressing the dangers and seeking to deter fans from duplicating the actions seen in their ring.

In addition to actual backyards, backyard wrestling can occur in spaces including parks, fields, and warehouses. Initially camcorder-filmed events were shared person-to-person; increasingly public-access television and the internet have come to be used. It has also broken into the media with several Best of Backyard Wrestling volumes produced, two video games entitled Backyard Wrestling: Don't Try This at Home and Backyard Wrestling 2: There Goes the Neighborhood, and a 2002 documentary entitled The Backyard, showcasing backyard wrestling under a more mainstream light as it follows several wrestlers and federations from all over the world, detailing the different styles and portrayals of backyard wrestling. In an interview, the director Paul Hough compared The Backyard to Beyond the Mat, but with yarders.

In May 2015, Global News ran a story on the VBW, a backyard wrestling organization in the Pacific Northwest who produce wrestling episodes for public streaming services. The segment, hosted by sports director and anchor Squire Barns, follows the crew as they prepare for the release of the organization's biggest event, Yardstock 2015. In 2016, A-List Productions released a 2-hour documentary titled The Link, chronicling over a decade of backyard wrestling beginning in the early 2000s with participants across the United States, Canada, and the UK, as well as their footprint in the professional wrestling business to this day.

Television
 MTV's True Life: I'm A Backyard Wrestler
 Squire's Take: low budget backyard wrestling
The Ricki Lake Show: "Backyard Bloodbath!"

Films and documentaries
The Backyard
Best of Backyard Wrestling Vol. 1-6
 CNN News: Backyard Beatdown (2006 Hardcore vs Non)
 Traces of Death V: Back in Action
Backyard Dogs
 NWF Kids Pro Wrestling: The Untold Story
 '[https://www.youtube.com/watch?v=e8fCS0aTaWA 'The Link, documentary]Backyard Wrestling (2002)Death Death Documentary (2007)The Backyard Wrestler - The Life and Times of Aston Crude (2020)

Video gamesBackyard Wrestling: Don't Try This at HomeBackyard Wrestling 2: There Goes the Neighborhood''

See also
 Styles of wrestling

References

Wrestling

it:Terminologia del wrestling#B